is a Japanese manga artist whose works draw on Old Norse literature and other subjects from Northern Europe.

Biography and career
In high school, start drawing manga seriously. After that, joined the same Manga Dōjin group "Sakuga Group". Azumi published her first work in 1981 and made steady contributions to Wings and other magazines in the early 80's. In 1986 she published the first part of her magnum opus, The Scarlet Sword (緋色い剣, Akai Tsurugi). The work appeared in installations up to 1993, consisting of a total of 1675 pages in 10 volumes. Akai Tsurugi takes place in the 10th century Nordic world, following both mortal heroes invented by the author and the Norse gods struggling against Ragnarök. The author attempts to situate her story naturally within the Norse literary tradition, working with such real historical themes as the social changes brought on by the conversion of the Norse peoples to Christianity. Many of Azumi's other works explore similar subjects.

Recent works
More recent series by Azumi include the following.

  A four volume series based on Der Ring des Nibelungen, published 1989-1991
  A five volume series published 1992-1995
  A five volume series based on the life of Óláfr Tryggvason, published 1994-2001
 Manga Mutiny, Manga Melech, Manga Messengers, Manga Majesty' ' books 3-5,6 in the biblical Manga Messiah series published 2009 - 2019

 References 
 Halldór Stefánsson (1994). "Foreign myths and sagas in Japan: the academics and the cartoonists" in Beyond Boundaries: Understanding, Translation and Anthropological Discourse'', pp. 75–99, edited by Gísli Pálsson. Berg Publishers. 
 Azumi Ryo's manga - Akai Tsurugi 
 Azumi Ryou List of works
 Midnight Sun Author's homepage 

Year of birth missing (living people)
Living people
Manga artists from Tokyo